Michael J. Millican (born December 5, 1950) was an American politician. He was a member of the Alabama House of Representatives from the 17th District, serving from 1990 to 2018. He is a member of the Republican party.

References

Living people
Republican Party members of the Alabama House of Representatives
1950 births
People from Sulligent, Alabama
21st-century American politicians